Théodore-Herman Rutjes (December 11, 1833 – August 4, 1896) was a Dutch priest, missionary, and Vicar Apostolic of Eastern Mongolia.

Biography
Théodore-Herman Rutjes was born in the Netherlands, on December 11, 1833. He was ordained a priest on December 22, 1866. He joined the CICM Missionaries in his early years, and later was sent to preach in Inner Mongolia. On December 11, 1883, the Apostolic Vicariate of Eastern Mongolia was founded and he was appointed Vicar Apostolic.

On August 4, 1896, he died at the Cathedral, aged 62.

References

1833 births
1896 deaths
19th-century Dutch Roman Catholic priests
19th-century Roman Catholic bishops in China